The UK Singles Chart is one of many music charts compiled by the Official Charts Company that calculates the best-selling singles of the week in the United Kingdom. Before 2004, the chart was only based on the sales of physical singles. This list shows singles that peaked in the Top 10 of the UK Singles Chart during 1967, as well as singles which peaked in 1966 and 1968 but were in the top 10 in 1967. The entry date is when the single appeared in the top 10 for the first time (week ending, as published by the Official Charts Company, which is six days after the chart is announced).

One-hundred and sixteen singles were in the top ten in 1967. Ten singles from 1966 remained in the top 10 for several weeks at the beginning of the year, while "All My Love" by Cliff Richard, "Daydream Believer" by The Monkees, "Magical Mystery Tour (EP)" by The Beatles and "Thank U Very Much" by The Scaffold were all released in 1967 but did not reach their peak until 1968. "Save Me" by Dave Dee, Dozy, Beaky, Mick & Tich, "Sunshine Superman" by Donovan and "What Becomes of the Brokenhearted" by Jimmy Ruffin were the singles from 1966 to reach their peak in 1967. Twenty-nine artists scored multiple entries in the top 10 in 1967. Aretha Franklin, Bee Gees, Cat Stevens, Engelbert Humperdinck, The Monkees and Stevie Wonder were among the many artists who achieved their first UK charting top 10 single in 1967.

The 1966 Christmas number-one, "Green, Green Grass of Home" by Tom Jones, remained at number one for the first three weeks of 1967. The first new number-one single of the year was "I'm A Believer" by The Monkees. Overall, fourteen different singles peaked at number-one in 1967, with Engelbert Humperdinck and The Beatles (2) having the joint most singles hit that position.

Background

Multiple entries
One-hundred and sixteen singles charted in the top 10 in 1967, with one-hundred and five singles reaching their peak this year. "This is My Song" was recorded by Petula Clark and Harry Secombe and both versions reached the top 10.

Twenty-nine artists scored multiple entries in the top 10 in 1967. Tom Jones secured the record for most top 10 hits in 1967 with five hit singles.

Nancy Sinatra was one of a number of artists with two top-ten entries, including the number-one single "Somethin' Stupid" (with Frank Sinatra). The Beach Boys, Cat Stevens, Procol Harum, The Rolling Stones and Val Doonican were among the other artists who had multiple top 10 entries in 1967.

Chart debuts
Thirty-three artists achieved their first top 10 single in 1967, either as a lead or featured artist. Of these, three went on to record another hit single that year: Bee Gees, Cat Stevens and Procol Harum. Engelbert Humperdinck, The Jimi Hendrix Experience, The Move and Traffic all had two more top 10 singles in 1967. The Monkees had three other entries in their breakthrough year.

The following table (collapsed on desktop site) does not include acts who had previously charted as part of a group and secured their first top 10 solo single.

Notes
Harry Secombe had previously achieved two top 10 singles as a member of The Goons, but his cover version of "This is My Song" marked his first and only top 10 appearance as a solo artist. Dave Davies was the lead guitarist for the rock band The Kinks. "Death of a Clown" was his debut solo single, peaking at number three. "Reflections" was the first single for The Supremes under their new name, Diana Ross & the Supremes. "San Franciscan Nights" was billed as Eric Burdon and The Animals - Burdon was a vocalist in the group.

Songs from films
Original songs from various films entered the top 10 throughout the year. These included "The Happening" (from The Happening), "Here We Go Round the Mulberry Bush" (Here We Go Round the Mulberry Bush) and "I've Been a Bad, Bad Boy" (Privilege).

Additionally, Vince Hill recorded a version of "Edelweiss" from The Sound of Music, with the song reaching number two in the chart.

Best-selling singles
Until 1970 there was no universally recognised year-end best-sellers list. However in 2011 the Official Charts Company released a list of the best-selling single of each year in chart history from 1952 to date. According to the list, "Release Me" by Engelbert Humperdinck is officially recorded as the biggest-selling single of 1967. "Release Me" (8) also ranked in the top 10 best-selling singles of the decade.

Top-ten singles
Key

Entries by artist

The following table shows artists who achieved two or more top 10 entries in 1967, including singles that reached their peak in 1966 or 1968. The figures include both main artists and featured artists. The total number of weeks an artist spent in the top ten in 1967 is also shown.

Notes

 "Daydream Believer" reached its peak of number five on 16 January 1968 (week ending).
 "Thank U Very Much" reached its peak of number four on 9 January 1968 (week ending).
 "My Mind's Eye" re-entered the top 10 at number 10 on 11 January 1967 (week ending).
 The Supremes' name was altered to Diana Ross & The Supremes in 1967.
 "What Becomes of the Brokenhearted" re-entered the top 10 at number 8 on 4 January 1967 (week ending).
 "Puppet on a String" was the United Kingdom's winning entry at the Eurovision Song Contest in 1967.
 "Alternate Title" was originally known as "Randy Scouse Git" but The Monkees' record label (RCA) asked for it to be changed. "Randy Scouse Git" was a reference from the sitcom Till Death Us Do Part.
 "All You Need Is Love" was used as the UK's contribution to the first live global television programme, Our World. For the show it was performed over a pre-recorded backing track.
 "Up, Up and Away" re-entered the top 10 at number 8 on 15 August 1967 (week ending) for 3 weeks.
 "There Must Be a Way" re-entered the top 10 at number 10 on 14 November 1967 (week ending).
 "All My Love" re-entered the top 10 at number 7 on 26 December 1967 (week ending) for 2 weeks.
 "Here We Go Round the Mulberry Bush" re-entered the top 10 at number 10 on 16 January 1968 (week ending).
 Figure includes single that peaked in 1966.
 Figure includes single that peaked in 1968.
 Figure includes three top 10 hits with the group The Kinks.
 Figure includes single that first charted in 1966 but peaked in 1967.
 Two of Diana Ross & the Supremes entries were recorded under their old name The Supremes.

See also
1967 in British music
List of number-one singles from the 1960s (UK)

References
General

Specific

External links
1967 singles chart archive at the Official Charts Company (click on relevant week)

United Kingdom
Top 10 singles
1967